Nummela is the largest urban agglomeration and municipality seat of Vihti municipality in Southern Finland. Population of Nummela's urban area is around 13 500 and population within its post code is around 15 000.

Nummela has an airport (ICAO: EFNU) that is suitable for gliding.

Famous people from Nummela 
Uma Aaltonen, writer
Merikukka Forsius, politician
Ella Kanninen, television presenter
Vivi Friedman, film director
Veikko Helle, politician
Anssi Kela, singer
Jani Lakanen, orienteering competitor
Aleksi Mäkelä, film director
Markus ”Zarkus” Poussa, musician
Markus Selin, film producer
Jani Sievinen, swimmer
Eeli Tolvanen, ice hockey player

Gallery

See also
 Muijala
 Ojakkala
 Vihti (village)

References

Links

Villages in Finland
Vihti